Maria Paola Zavagli (born 4 June 1977) is a former professional tennis player from Italy.

Biography
Zavagli, a right-handed player, was born in the Tuscan town of Bibbiena. One of two sisters, her father is a doctor and her mother a teacher. She began playing tennis at the age of 10, under the tuition of her uncle.

As a junior, she twice won the doubles event at the Orange Bowl competition, with Alice Canepa in 1994, then partnering Giulia Casoni in 1995.

In 1997, she won three ITF singles titles and won two medals at the 1997 Mediterranean Games.

Her best performance on the WTA Tour was a quarterfinal appearance at the 1998 Internazionali Femminili di Palermo, with wins over Flora Perfetti and Sandra Cecchini.

She featured in the doubles main draws at both the 2000 French Open and 2000 Wimbledon Championships, partnering Slovakian Janette Husárová in each tournament.

ITF Circuit finals

Singles: 6 (4 titles, 2 runner-ups)

Doubles: 13 (5 titles, 8 runner-ups)

References

External links
 
 

1977 births
Living people
Italian female tennis players
Sportspeople from the Province of Arezzo
Competitors at the 1997 Mediterranean Games
Mediterranean Games silver medalists for Italy
Mediterranean Games medalists in tennis